Tuiren may refer to:
 Tuireann, Irish mythological figure
 Tuiren (star), a G-type main-sequence star